In mathematics, a coframe or coframe field on a smooth manifold  is a system of one-forms or covectors which form a basis of the cotangent bundle at every point. If  is  dimensional a coframe is given by a section  of  such that .

References

See also 

 Frame fields in general relativity
 Moving frame

Differential geometry